Eusporangiate ferns are vascular spore plants, whose sporangia arise from several epidermal cells and not from a single cell as in leptosporangiate ferns. Typically these ferns have reduced root systems and sporangia that produce large amounts of spores (up to 7000 spores per sporangium in Christensenia)

There are four extant eusporangiate fern families, distributed among three classes. Each family is assigned to its own order.
Class Psilotopsida
Order Psilotales, family Psilotaceae – Whisk ferns (2 genera, about 17 species)
Order Ophioglossales, family Ophioglossaceae – Adder's-tongues (5 genera, about 80 species)
Class Equisetopsida
Order Equisetales, family Equisetaceae – Horsetails (1 genus, about 15 species)
Class Marattiopsida
Order Marattiales, family Marattiaceae – Marattoid ferns (6 genera, about 500 species)

The following diagram shows a likely phylogenic placement of eusporangiate fern classes within the vascular plants.

Cladistics
While it is generally accepted that the leptosporangiate ferns are monophyletic, it is considered to be likely that the eusporangiate ferns, as a group, are paraphyletic.  In each of the three examples from recently published studies, shown in the following table, it can be seen that, together, the four eusporangiate fern families do not form a single clade.

References

 Hogan, C.Michael. 2010. Fern. Encyclopedia of Earth, National Council for Science and the Environment. topic ed. Saikat Basu
Sporne, K. R. 1962. The morphology of pteridophytes, the structure of ferns and allied plants. pp. 127–135. Hutchison & Co. London.

Ferns